The Bardzkie Mountains are a mountain range in the Central Sudetes in Poland.

Major towns:
 Bardo (German: Wartha)
 Ząbkowice Śląskie (German: Frankenstein in Schlesien)
 Kamieniec Ząbkowicki (German: Kamenz)
 Srebrna Góra (German: Silberberg)
 Kłodzko (German: Glatz)

References

Sudetes
Mountain ranges of Poland